= Parliament of Korea =

Parliament of Korea may refer to

- the National Assembly of the Republic of Korea, the unicameral legislature of South Korea
- the Supreme People's Assembly, the unicameral legislature of North Korea
